Parliamentary election were held for the first time in the United Arab Emirates in December 2006 to elect half of the 40 members of Federal National Council. Voting took place in Abu Dhabi and Fujairah on 16 December, in Dubai and Ras al-Khaimah on 18 December, and in Sharjah, Ajman and Umm al-Quwain on 20 December.

Electoral system
The 40 members of the Federal National Council consisted of 20 elected members and 20 members appointed by the rulers of each Emirate.

The elections were held using electoral colleges, with only 6,689 of more than 300,000 citizens over 18 years were allowed to vote, of which 1,163 were women. The electoral college members were chosen by the rulers of the seven emirates.

Results
Only one woman was elected (Amal Al Qubaisi in Abu Dhabi) and eight were amongst the appointed members announced on 4 February 2007. Umm al-Qaiwain was the only emirate without female representation.

Aftermath
The newly-elected Federal National Council was opened on 12 February 2007 by President Khalifa bin Zayed Al Nahyan.

References

Parliamentary
United Arab Emirates
Elections in the United Arab Emirates
United Arab Emirates